Robert Gordon "Rob" D'Alton (22 February 1923 – 17 August 1996) was an Irish sailor who competed in the 1964 Summer Olympics. He weighed 150 lbs. (68 kg)

References

1923 births
1996 deaths
Olympic sailors of Ireland
Irish male sailors (sport)
Sailors at the 1964 Summer Olympics – Dragon